Leucostoma anthracinum is a species of fly in the family Tachinidae, found in Europe.

References

Phasiinae
Diptera of Europe
Insects described in 1824